Ilse von Alpenheim (born February 11, 1927) is an Austrian  pianist.

Biography
Born at Innsbruck, she was trained  by her mother, a piano teacher, and made her first public appearance as soloist at the age of nine in Joseph Haydn's Piano Concerto Hob. XVIII,11. In 1951 she moved to Switzerland.

In the mid-1950s she met Sándor Veress, a Hungarian composer, with whom she lived for over a decade. She was instrumental in promoting the piano works of Veress. Between 1960 and 1968 she was in charge of a concert class at the Conservatory of Berne. In 1971 she became the wife of Antal Doráti, another Hungarian conductor and composer, who wrote several works for her and with whom she developed an intensive international concert activity.

Her career has taken her to four continents where she has appeared in recitals and as a soloist with many prominent orchestras. Her chamber music partners include Max Rostal, Henryk Szeryng, Igor Ozim, Walter Grimmer, the Amadeus Quartet and the Camerata Bern.

von Alpenheim's repertory focuses mainly on the classical and early romantic composers. She has recorded all the Haydn piano sonatas, concertini and concerti. The sonatas were issued on CD by the Antal Doráti Centenary Society in 2015. She also made an integral recording of the Songs Without Words by Mendelssohn. Together with the Arion Trio, she has recorded all Mozart's piano trios and the complete works of Schubert for piano and strings.

References

1927 births
Living people
Musicians from Innsbruck
Austrian classical pianists
Austrian women pianists
21st-century classical pianists
Women classical pianists
21st-century women pianists